Bossiaea walkeri, commonly known as cactus bossiaea, cactus pea, or Walker's stick bush is a species of flowering plant in the pea family (Fabaceae) and is endemic to southern mainland Australia. It is a rigid, much-branched shrub with flattened, winged cladodes and red, pea-like flowers between July and November in the species' native range.

Description
The wings are salmon pink and the keel is deep red.

Taxonomy
Bossiaea walkeri was first formally described in 1861 by Ferdinand von Mueller in Fragmenta Phytographiae Australiae from specimens collected by Alexander Walker on hills between the Lachlan and Murrumbidgee Rivers. The specific epithet (walkeri) honours the collector of the type specimens.

Distribution and habitat 
Cactus bossiaea grows in mallee, low open woodland, creek beds and rocky outcrops and occurs in Western Australia, South Australia, Victoria and New South Wales.  It is found from near Shark Bay in Western Australia, through the south-west of the state to southern South Australia, the Murray River and Wyperfeld National Park in Victoria, and to inland New South Wales. The species is rare in Victoria, where it is listed as "endangered" under the Victorian Government Flora and Fauna Guarantee Act 1988.

Ecology 
The pendent flowers and the unusual shape of the flower parts of B. walkeri suggest that it is bird-pollinated. Honeyeaters and blue wrens have been observed visiting the flowers.

Reproduction 
The 2cm flowers are produced between July and November. They will often flower after seed has set to take full advantage of additional rainfall after a dry period. The fruit is a hairless, flattened 6cm by 1cm pod that contains brown seeds. The pods begin green but mature to brown, the seeds become ripe usually 2 to 3 months after flowering has finished. Then on a hot day the pods will explode to disperse the seed several metres. Birds are the primary pollinators, but small animals and insects also contribute.

Uses

Use in horticulture
This species is described as "decorative" and can be propagated from seed or from cuttings. It can be grown in full sun or part shade, is drought and frost tolerant but needs relatively dry, well-drained soil.

Other uses
Bossiaea walkeri produces a very distinct honey, although it appears to have no pastoral value.

References

walkeri
Mirbelioids
Flora of New South Wales
Flora of Victoria (Australia)
Rosids of Western Australia
Flora of South Australia
Taxa named by Ferdinand von Mueller